The  May Atsmi massacre was a mass extrajudicial killing that took place in May Atsmi in the Tigray Region of Ethiopia during the Tigray War, on 1 April 2021. May Atsmi is a village south of Wukro Maray in woreda Tahtay Maychew, Central zone of Tigray.

Massacre
The Eritrean Defence Forces (EDF) killed 22 civilians in May Atsmi (Central Tigray) on 1 April 2021.

The massacres in Wukro Maray and surroundings were carried out by Ethiopian and Eritrean forces, while being defeated by TDF.

Reactions
After months of denial by the Ethiopian authorities that massacres occurred in Tigray, a joint investigation by OHCHR and the Ethiopian Human Rights Commission was announced in March 2021.

While the Ethiopian government promised that Eritrean troops will be pulled out from Tigray, the Eritrean government denies any participation in warfare in Tigray, let alone in massacres.

See also 
Tisha massacre
Haddush Addi massacre

References

External links
World Peace Foundation: Starving Tigray

2021 massacres of the Tigray War
April 2021 crimes in Africa